Nadine Kaadan (born 1985 in Paris) is a Syrian children's book illustrator and writer living in London. 

She has published 15 books, including stories celebrating the Arab world.

Her mission is to champion empowered and inclusive representation in children’s books so that every child can see themselves in a story.

She is a member of the International Board on Books for Young People (IBBY). Her illustrations have been exhibited at the
BIB exhibition (Biennale of illustration Bratislava 2011).

In 2021, Nadine was commissioned by The Story Museum to be the writer of Amal Meets Alice, a procession event in Oxford

Early life and education
Nadine was born in Syria. 

She graduated in the Faculty of Fine Arts of Damascus
and acquired two Masters, one in Illustration at Kingston University, and another in Art and Politics at Goldsmith College, University of London.

Awards
Kaadan was on the list of the BBC's 100 Women announced on 23 November 2020.
"Leila Answer Me" (2011) Winner Anna Lindh Award (the Best Fiction Book for children with special needs),
"Tomorrow" (2019) nominee Kate Greenaway Medal
"Tomorrow" (2019) nominee The Little Rebels Children's Book Awards

Notes

Syrian children's book illustrators
1985 births
Living people
BBC 100 Women